Dolly Gray may refer to:

 Dolly Gray (baseball) (1878–1956), American baseball pitcher
 Willie Gray (nicknamed "Dolly", fl. 1920–1937), American Negro league baseball player
 Dolly Gray impostor (fl. 1923), American football player
 Goodbye, Dolly Gray, American music hall song written in the 1890s